General Read or Reade may refer to:

Antony Read (1913–2000), British Army general
George Reade (1687–1756), British Army lieutenant general
George Windle Read Jr. (1900–1974), U.S. Army lieutenant general
George Windle Read (1860–1934), U.S. Army major general
John Read (British Army officer) (1917–1987), British Army lieutenant general
Raymond Northland Revell Reade (1861–1943), British Army major general

See also
General Reed (disambiguation)
General Reid (disambiguation)